Coca-Cola Nordic Racing (formerly Nordic Racing 1993-2000) was an auto racing team from United Kingdom. Nordic Racing was owned by Derek Mower. It was headquartered in Thetford, UK. The team achieved its best results came in 2001 International Formula 3000 season when new sponsorship with Coca-Cola and strong line-up of Tomáš Enge and Justin Wilson brought titles in both teams championship and drivers championship of Wilson. The team last competed in 2002.

Complete Formula 3000 results
(key) (Races in bold indicate pole position; races in italics indicate fastest lap)

References

British auto racing teams
International Formula 3000 teams
Auto racing teams established in 1993